I'm for the Hippopotamus is a 1979 Italian adventure-comedy film directed by Italo Zingarelli and starring the comedy team of Terence Hill and Bud Spencer.

Plot 
Two cousins engage in a semi-friendly rivalry at the beginning of the film.  Hill's character occasionally ruins the other's hunting safaris.  It turns out that Spencer's character is none too honest, either, since he gives his tourists rifles loaded with blanks so they can't hurt each other or the animals. The two have to team up to stop a villain, with plenty of comedy, eating, and mild violence.

Cast 
Terence Hill as Slim
Bud Spencer as Tom
Joe Bugner as Ormond
May Dlamini as Mama Leone
Dawn Jürgens as Stella (Slim's lady-love)
Malcolm Kirk as Ormond's bald henchman
Ben Masinga as Jason
Les Marcowitz as Trixie, Ormond's short henchman 
Johan Naude
Nick Van Rensburg
Hugh Rouse as Police Captain, arresting Slim and Tom
Mike Schutte as Ormond's henchman (German version: Lumpi)
Kosie Smith as Ormond's henchman with moustache (German version: Kopf, wie 'n Hauklotz)
Joseph Szucs
Sandy Nkomo as Senghor (Stella's father)

Soundtrack 
As with many other Spencer & Hill films, its soundtrack and theme song "Grau Grau Grau" (both composed and performed by Walter Rizzati, with Spencer himself providing lead vocals on the song) became very popular in Italy at the time of the film's release, and are still popular among the duo's international fan base.

References

External links 

1979 films
1970s adventure comedy films
Italian adventure comedy films
1970s Italian-language films
Terence Hill and Bud Spencer
Films directed by Italo Zingarelli
Films shot in South Africa
Films about hunters
1979 comedy films
1970s Italian films